Smile and Wave is the third album by Canadian rock band Headstones. It was certified Gold in Canada, and sold 100,000 copies by April 2000.

Track listing

      
    
There are several hidden tracks following "Physics", including "Anything" as well as some recorded antics.

Awards and certifications
In 1997, Smile and Wave was certified gold by Music Canada. The following year, the album was nominated for Blockbuster Rock Album of the Year at the Juno Awards of 1998.

Chart performance

Reception

Critics gave differing opinions on the music and lyrics of Smile and Wave. When reviewing the album's music, the Calgary Herald said the album went for the "rock jugular from start to finish", though the Toronto Star called the Headstones' work "a murky, steaming cauldron of pungent rock 'n' roll".

Alternatively, reviewers gave mixed reviews for Hugh Dillon's performance. The Edmonton Journal said Dillon's personality was better than his singing, while the Ottawa Journal felt that Dillion's sarcastic lyrics were almost too much for the album.

References

1997 albums
Headstones (band) albums
MCA Records albums
Albums recorded at Metalworks Studios